Redford, officially the Charter Township of Redford, is a charter township in Wayne County in the U.S. state of Michigan. The township shares its eastern border with the city of Detroit.  The population was 49,504 at the 2020 census.

History
Springwells Township and Bucklin Township were formally organized and laid out by gubernatorial act on April 12, 1827. Postal regulations prohibiting two post offices having the same name required—when a township was subdivided—unique names had to be found. The Bucklin name was extinguished when it was split on October 29, 1829, along what is now Inkster Road into Nankin Township (west half) and Pekin Township (east half), named as a result of a wave of interest in China. In March 1833, Pekin was renamed Redford and the southern half became Dearborn Township on April 1. The name Redford was chosen because natives and colonial European immigrants forded the River Rouge where the river runs through Redford. "Rouge" is French for "red."

The township used to go all the way to Greenfield Road, but in the 1920s the eastern portions of the township were annexed by Detroit. This annexation ceased
in 1926 when the township was given "charter" status by the Michigan legislature.  In 1918 there was a post office named "Five Points" operating between 6 Mile Road and 7 Mile Road along the road of that name.

Redford is the site of Hosanna-Tabor Evangelical Lutheran Church and School, whose hiring practices spurred the 2012 Supreme Court Case Hosanna-Tabor Evangelical Lutheran Church and School v. Equal Employment Opportunity Commission.

Geography
Redford Township is a western suburb of Detroit. The middle branch of the River Rouge flows through the Lola Valley Park in the township. Ashcroft creek, another branch of the Rouge River  flows for about a half mile in the southeastern corner of the township before entering Detroit's Rouge Park  and then into the main branch of the Rouge. Tarabusi Creek of the Bell Branch, another branch of the Rouge River, flows through Western Golf Club and Bell Creek Park.

Demographics

2010 census
In 2010, Redford Township had a population of 48,362. The ethnic and racial makeup of the population was 64.7% white, 28.7% African-American, 0.8% Asian, 2.3% reporting more than one race, 0.6% reporting other races (apparently including those who reported being Native American and being Pacific Islander as well as those who just marked the other box) and 2.9% Hispanic or Latino of any race. The African-American population increased by about 200% between 2000 and 2010, while the overall population of the township declined by 6%.

Population trends
The U.S. Census Bureau also defined Redford Township as a census-designated place (CDP) in the 2000 Census so that the community would appear on the list of places (like cities and villages) as well on the list of county subdivisions (like other townships). The final statistics for the township and the CDP were identical.

2000 census
As of the census of 2000, there were 51,622 people, 20,182 households, and 13,582 families living in the township. The racial makeup of the township was 87.98% White, 8.54% African American, 0.43% Native American, 0.76% Asian, 0.02% Pacific Islander, 0.57% from other races, and 1.70% from two or more races. Hispanic or Latino of any race were 2.02% of the population.

There were 20,182 households, out of which 31.8% had children under the age of 18 living with them, 50.4% were married couples living together, 12.1% had a female householder with no husband present, and 32.7% were non-families. 27.3% of all households were made up of individuals, and 11.6% had someone living alone who was 65 years of age or older.  The average household size was 2.54 and the average family size was 3.12.

In the township the population was spread out, with 25.3% under the age of 18, 7.0% from 18 to 24, 34.0% from 25 to 44, 18.7% from 45 to 64, and 14.9% who were 65 years of age or older.  The median age was 36 years. For every 100 females, there were 96.1 males.  For every 100 females age 18 and over, there were 92.9 males.

The median income for a household in the township was $49,522, and the median income for a family was $56,461. Males had a median income of $41,923 versus $29,987 for females. The per capita income for the township was $22,263.  About 3.2% of families and 5.1% of the population were below the poverty line, including 6.0% of those under age 18 and 5.2% of those age 65 or over.

As of the census of 2010, there were 48,362 people, 19,148 households, and 12,387 families living in the township. The racial makeup of the township was 66.4% White, 28.9% African American, 0.5% Native American, 0.8% Asian, 0.02% Pacific Islander, 0.8% from other races, and 2.5% from two or more races. Hispanic or Latino of any race were 2.9% of the population.

Education

Schools
The public schools are operated by the Redford Union School District, South Redford School District and Clarenceville School District.

Public high schools include:
Redford Union High School
Thurston High School

The Roman Catholic Archdiocese of Detroit used to operate Bishop Borgess High School and Academy (closed in 2005) and Detroit Catholic Central High School (relocated to Novi, Michigan in 2005) in Redford Township.

Public library
Redford Township Library is located on West Six Mile Road. The library service began in the 1920s, with a bookmobile providing service to the citizens of Redford Township. By the 1950s, the library operated out of a small store front on Beech-Daly Rd. about a block south of Fenkel. A larger,  newly constructed and more modern Redford Township District Library operated from 1962 until August 23, 2004, when the library moved again to another newly constructed, even larger, technologically updated building. In a $4.5 million project, the old library building was turned into an open-air market, amphitheater (the Redford Marquee) and public green space. The Redford Marquee opened in July 2008. The construction of the new library was facilitated by an $8.5 million community bond. The  facility is situated on a  site that is being leased for $1 for 99 years. The library's collection consists of 100,000 books and periodicals, 2,500 CDs, records, cassettes and other audio materials, in addition to 2,500 video items.

Highways
 
  (Telegraph Road)
  (West Grand River Avenue)
  (Eight Mile Road)

Notable people

Redford is the birthplace of musician Ted Nugent (December 13, 1948), arena football player Stephen Wasil (April 14, 1984), NFL player Eric Wilson (September 26, 1994), and Paul Waterman, businessman and CEO (July 24, 1964)

References in popular culture
Folk musician and songwriter Sufjan Stevens' song "Redford (For Yia-Yia & Pappou)," which appeared on his 2003 album Michigan, mutely chronicles Stevens' childhood experiences in Redford Township, where his grandparents lived.

Sister cities

 St. Johann in Tirol, Austria
 Gau-Algesheim, Rhineland-Palatinate, Germany

References

Additional sources

External links

Charter Township of Redford

 
Townships in Wayne County, Michigan
Charter townships in Michigan
Former census-designated places in Michigan
1829 establishments in Michigan Territory
Populated places established in 1829